Interpedia was the first-proposed online encyclopedia which would allow anyone to contribute by writing articles and submitting them to the central catalogue of all Interpedia pages.

History
Interpedia was initiated by Rick Gates, who posted a message titled "The Internet Encyclopedia" on October 25, 1993 to the PACS-L (Public-Access Computer Systems Forum) Listserv.  That message included the following musings:

In November 1993, discussions moved to a dedicated mailing list, supplemented later by Usenet newsgroup .

Several independent "Seal-of-approval" (SOAP) agencies were envisioned which would rate Interpedia articles based on criteria of their own choosing; users could then decide which agencies' recommendations to follow.

The project was actively discussed for around half a year, but never left the planning stages, perhaps partly due to the unprecedented growth of the World Wide Web.

See also
Online encyclopedia
List of online encyclopedias

References

Further reading

External links
 Interpedia's disclaimer by John Hunt
 

American online encyclopedias